The Unwaba Revelations  is a 2007 Indian fantasy novel written by Samit Basu. It is the third and final novel in the Game World trilogy after The Simoqin Prophecies (2004) and The Manticore's Secret (2005). The "Unwaba" is a chameleon, borrowed from a similar creature in the Zulu tradition, which acts as a narrator to the story. The novel was a critical and commercial success.

Characters

Reception
Devangshu Datta of Outlook said that the novel "leans on both Tolkien and Pratchett in terms of format, while liberally borrowing from the Ramayana, John Brunner, George Lucas, Lovecraft et al." Parizaad Khan of Mint gave a positive response and called it a "delicious read". Ramya Sarma of Daily News and Analysis said, "Basu’s latest offering is worth reading, if only to find out how the ends left loose in the first two novels are tied up."
A review carried by Hindustan Times wrote: "Epic battles between the gods and the bad guys (demons, in this case) scorch the pages of this 500-page-plus book."

References

External links
The Unwaba Revelations at Penguin Books

2007 Indian novels
Gameworld Trilogy
Indian fantasy novels
Indian English-language novels